Area 20 may refer to:
 Area 20 (Nevada National Security Site)
 Brodmann area 20, a part of the cerebral cortex in the brain.